Daomu Biji variously translated as Grave Robbers’ Chronicles, Grave Robbery Note and The Lost Tomb, is a novel series about the grave-robbing adventures of Wu Xie, a young man hailing from a family that had been tomb-raiders for centuries. The series was written by Xu Lei, better known by his pen-name Nan Pai San Shu. It was first serialized online at Qidian China, a Chinese website for publishing, writing and reading novels, as a fanwork of Ghost Blows Out the Light originally. Written over a span of five years and published as nine separate novels, it is one of the most popular novel series in China from 2007 with several million fans and over 20 million copies sold. The author has also written two sequels, Zang Hai Hua, Sha Hai, which continued the leading character's story, neither of which were finished at the time of the author's announcement to retire from writing on March 22, 2013. The author returned to writing in 2019 with another sequel, Reboot: Thunder at the Distant Sea.

Along with Ghost Blows Out the Light, Daomu has contributed greatly to creating a craze and subsequent market in the Greater China area for novels focusing on grave-robbing that also deal with the supernatural.

Plot
Fifty years ago, a group of Changsha grave robbers dug out manuscripts of the location of treasures from Warring states, but an encounter with an undead rendered almost the whole group dead. In the present, the young grandchild of the sole survivor, Wu Xie, discovers a secret within his grandfather's notes. Together with his third uncle, Wu Sanxing, and a few other experienced tomb robbers, to search for the treasure. But what no one expected to find the intriguing mysteries that accompanied their tomb robbing adventure - just who was the owner of that tomb? Will they be able to find the real coffin? And just where will these puzzle lead the group?

Embarking on eight-volume's worth of adventures, as Wu Xie slowly unravels millennium-old mysteries, he sees the deterioration of his naïve world as he discovers the people around him are not what they seem and that he could trust no one in this tomb robbing world of deceit and lies.

Main characters
 Wu Xie: The point-of-view character and primary protagonist. He is from the Hangzhou Wu family, one of the Changsha Old Nine, a group of families who have been grave-robbing for centuries. At the beginning of the first book he joins his uncle Wu Sanxing to experience grave-robbing for the first time, setting off the series of events to come in later books. His name is a homophone with "innocent" (also pronounced "Wu Xie"), indicating his gullible nature.
 Zhang Qiling: A man with a mysterious past whose story leads the last few volumes of the chronicles. He is often hired as an assistant to many grave-robbing endeavors and is highly competent at it; very little is known about him, even his real name. He is from the true branch of the Zhang family, one of the Changsha Old Nine. Like all true branch Zhang family members, he has a Qilin tattoo spanning his left shoulder, his blood is noted to ward off evil, and his index and middle finger are noticeably longer than his other fingers.
 "Fatty" Wang: Nicknamed "Gold Getting Xiao Wei", he is a northern grave-robber (as opposed to Wu Xie, from the south) and teams up with both Wu Xie and Zhang Qiling throughout the books; together they are referred to as the "Iron Triangle."
 Wu Sanxing: Wu Xie's third uncle. An experienced grave-robber with a few well-kept secrets.
 Pan Zi: Sanxing's right-hand man, who had served in the Sino-Vietnamese War prior to becoming a grave-robber.
 A'ning: A grave-robber and the first major female introduced in the series, her motives are unclear but she seems to be working against the protagonists. She has ties to Henry Cox, the antagonist of the Changsha Old Nine.
 Yun Cai: A Yao girl who helps Fat Wang and Wu Xie during their adventures in Yunnan.
 Hei Yanjing(): A mercenary with a mysterious past and is thought to be as competent as Zhang Qiling. He takes every opportunity to make money and is noted to be very expensive. Like Zhang Qiling, very little is known about his past; his real name is said to be very ugly. He has ties to the Qi family of the Changsha Old Nine. He becomes Wu Xie's mentor in Tomb of the Sea. His eyes are special in that the darker an area is, the better he can see. His name literally means "Black Glasses". Because of his eyes, he is often called "Black Blind()".
 Xie Yuchen(): The current head of the Xie family, one of the Changsha Old Nine. A childhood friend of Wu Xie, he is adept in martial arts, Chinese opera, and various other skills. He is noted to be very wealthy, enough to afford Hei Yanjing multiple times, and is the successor and student of Er Yue Hong, previous Hong family head of the Changsha Old Nine. Because of his "pretty-boy" looks and his tendency to wear pink, he is often called "Xiao Hua()", literally meaning "Little Flower".

Adaptations
In 2011, a serialized manhua, drawn by Dongdong and Yuelu, was published. After the fifth volume, the author of Daomu Biji had an argument with Dongdong and Yuelu. This, unfortunately ended the manhua series.
There is also an American serialized graphic novel. There are currently 8 novels.

In 2014, it was announced that the series would be made into eight seasons (though only three seasons have been made as of 2020), with the first season airing in 2015. It covered the events of the first book, and was titled The Lost Tomb in English.

In 2016, the novel series was adapted into an action adventure movie titled Time Raiders. The movie made 1 billion yuan at the box office. The movie ranked the ninth largest box office in mainland China in 2016, and it placed fifth place in the Chinese movie box office ranking. The prequel, The Mystic Nine was adapted into a series as well followed by four spin-off web movies focusing on four of the characters.

In 2019, the second season of the 2015 adaptation, titled The Lost Tomb 2, began aired with an all-new cast. It covers the events of the second, third, and partially fourth books.

In December 2020, the third season of the 2015 adaptation, titled Ultimate Note, aired with an all-new cast, aside from the returning cast of Wang Meng, Zhang Ri Shan, Yin Nan Feng, Chen Pi A Si, Jin Wan Tang from Sha Hai and Hendry Cox from The Lost Tomb 2. It covers the events of the fifth, sixth, and seven books.

In 2018, the first sequel was adapted and titled Tomb of the Sea and was aired with an all-new cast and returning actors from The Lost Tomb 2. It covers the events of the sequel Sha Hai and a bit of Zang Hai Hua. It was followed by three spin-off web movies, Tomb of the Sea Side Story: Bang Ren, Tomb of the Sea Side Story: Hua Mei, and Tomb of the Sea Side Story: Ran Gu.

In July 2020, the online drama Reunion: The Sound of the Providence aired, with a new cast headed by Zhu Yilong, aside from the returning cast of "Fatty" Wang, Kan Jian, Huo Daofu and returning actors from Tomb of the Sea. Split into two seasons with 62 episodes total, it adapted the sequel novel Reboot: Thunder at the Distant Sea. A short web series spin-off, Reunion: The Sound of the Providence Side Story: Ping Yao Wang Shi was released, focusing on the shared ancestor of the side characters. 

In 2021, the season sequel to The Lost Tomb 2, The Lost Tomb 2: Explore With the Note, began aired with an all-new cast, aside from the returning casts of "Fatty" Wang, Mrs. Huo, Hendry Cox and Wu Sanxing from The Lost Tomb 2. It covers the events of the fourth book. Another short web series spin-off, Echo of Moonfall was released, focusing on the side characters from Reunion: The Sound of the Providence. The action-adventure movie Reunion: Escape from the Monstrous Snake was also released with an all-new cast, aside from the returning cast of Hei Yanjing from Tomb of the Sea. It is a side-story that focuses on Hei Yanjing and his adventure in Cambodia.

In 2022, the action-adventure movie Reunion 2: Mystery of the Abyss, was released with an all-new cast, aside from the returning cast of Hei Yanjing from Tomb of the Sea and Reunion: Escape from the Monstrous Snake. It is a side-story whose plot was developed by the author and focuses on side characters from the series. Chronologically, it takes place before the extra-story novel Moving Forward Through the Flowery Night: The End Comes Without A Sound and after the two Reunion sequels. Filming for the season sequel to Tombe of the Sea, Tibetian Sea Flower was also completed.

Notes

References

21st-century Chinese novels
The Lost Tomb
Chinese novels adapted into television series
2007 Chinese novels
2008 Chinese novels
2009 Chinese novels
2010 Chinese novels
2011 Chinese novels